The Western Stone is a monolithic stone ashlar block forming part of the lower level of the Western Wall in Jerusalem. This largest stone in the Western Wall is visible within the Western Wall Tunnel. It is one of the largest building blocks in the world.

Dimensions

Exposed face

Depth
In June 2006, Harry M. Jol, from the University of Wisconsin–Eau Claire, performed GPR measurements to determine the depth of the stone.

Weight
The resulting calculated weight of the stone block is of 250–300 tonnes.

Pre-2006 estimates
Other pre-2006 sources circulated similar figures, namely 550 to 600 t.

Location
The stone is located in a section of the Western Wall (in the broader meaning of the term) north of Wilson's Arch, below ground level, and can be accessed through the Western Wall tunnels. It is part of the "Great Course", a name used by the WWHF for the tallest and longest course (layer of stones) of the Western Wall.

See also
 Herodian architecture
 Archaeology of Israel
 Stone of the Pregnant Woman

References

Archaeological artifacts
Western Wall
Tabernacle and Temples in Jerusalem
Stones